Ebaeides exigua is a species of beetle in the family Cerambycidae. It was described by Pascoe.

References

Ebaeides